The 1997 Wigan Warriors season was the 102nd season in the club's rugby league history and the second season in the Super League. Coached by Eric Hughes, the Warriors competed in Super League II and finished in 4th place, but went on to win the  Premiership Final at Old Trafford against St. Helens. The club also competed in the 1997 Challenge Cup, and were knocked out in the fourth round by St Helens.

Table

Squad
Source:

Players marked * left the club during the season.

Transfers

In

Out

References

External links
Wigan Warriors Rugby League Fan Site
 Super League II 1997 Wigan Warriors - Rugby League Project

Wigan Warriors seasons
Wigan Warriors